Duszyński (feminine: Duszyńska; plural: Duszyńscy) is a Polish surname. The Russian-language spelling is Dushinsky/ Dushinski 

Notable people with this surname include:

 Jerzy Duszyński (disambiguation), multiple individuals
 Kajetan Duszyński (born 1995), Polish sprinter

See also
 

Polish-language surnames